Two ships in the United States Navy have been named USS Sturtevant for Albert D. Sturtevant.

United States Navy ship names